
Gmina Herby is a rural gmina (municipality) in Lubliniec County, Silesian Voivodeship, in southern Poland. Until 1993 it also included the area which now makes up Gmina Boronów.

The gmina contains part of the protected area called Upper Liswarta Forests Landscape Park.

History
For several centuries Herby lay on the border of Lesser Poland and Silesia. Therefore, since the 13th century, one part of it belonged to the Holy Roman Empire and overlapping to the Kingdom of Prussia. The other part remained in Poland in the age of the Jagiellons and the Polish–Lithuanian Commonwealth. In the late 18th and in the 19th century, this part belonged to the Russian Empire.

Villages
Gmina Herby contains the villages and settlements of Brasowe, Braszczok, Chwostek, Cztery Kopy, Drapacz, Głąby, Hadra, Herby, Kalina, Kierzki, Kolonia Lisów, Łebki, Łęg, Lisów, Mochała, Niwy, Oleksiki, Olszyna, Otrzęsie, Pietrzaki, Piłka, Pustkowie, Tanina and Turza.

Neighbouring gminas
Gmina Herby is bordered by the gminas of Blachownia, Boronów, Ciasna, Kochanowice, Konopiska, Koszęcin, Przystajń and Wręczyca Wielka.

Traffic
Herby is situated at the crossing of Polish Coal Trunk-Line and the relation Częstochowa – Opole

References

Herby
Lubliniec County